The Marquette Trail is the name for a historically important land route in the Upper Peninsula of Michigan between what is now Marquette, and the Keweenaw Bay near Baraga and L'Anse. Today this route is covered by two modern highways:

See also

References

Historic trails and roads in Michigan
U.S. Route 41